C.L. "Gibby" Gilbert II (born January 14, 1941) is an American professional golfer who has won tournaments on both the PGA Tour and Champions Tour.

Gilbert was born and raised in Chattanooga, Tennessee, and still makes his home there with his wife Judy. His father started him in golf at the age of 13. He attended the University of Chattanooga. He turned pro in 1965 and joined the PGA Tour in 1967. Gilbert played on the PGA Tour for three years during the 1960s but did not have much success. In 1966 he took a job at Hillcrest Country Club in Hollywood, Florida in late 1969 he began working there permanently as assistant professional.

Gilbert had dozens of top 10 finishes on the PGA Tour and three victories. His first win came at the 1970 Houston Champions International, his second win was at the 1976 Danny Thomas Memphis Classic and his third win was at the 1977 Walt Disney World National Team Championship.

Gilbert's best finish at a major was a T-2 at the 1980 Masters, when he and Jack Newton finished four strokes behind the champion, Seve Ballesteros.

Gilbert has been active on the Champions Tour, winning six times.

Gilbert has had a lifelong interest in helping young people develop their golf skills. Since 1973, he has made annual appearances for the Tennessee PGA's Junior Golf Academy at Fall Creek Falls. Gilbert's son, Gibby III, is a professional golfer.

In his free time, Gilbert enjoys hunting and fishing. He was inducted into the Tennessee Sports Hall of Fame in 1992 and the Tennessee Golf Hall of Fame in 1995.

Professional wins (20)

PGA Tour wins (3)

PGA Tour playoff record (1–0)

Other wins (9)
1979 Tennessee PGA Championship
1986 Tennessee Open, Tennessee PGA Championship
1987 Tennessee PGA Championship
1988 Tennessee Open, Tennessee PGA Championship
1989 Tennessee Open
1990 Tennessee Open, Tennessee PGA Championship

Senior PGA Tour wins (6)

Senior PGA Tour playoff record (2–1)

Other senior wins (2)
2011 Liberty Mutual Legends of Golf - Demaret Division (with J. C. Snead)
2012 Liberty Mutual Legends of Golf - Demaret Division (with J. C. Snead)

Results in major championships

Note: Gilbert never played in The Open Championship.

CUT = missed the half-way cut
"T" indicates a tie for a place

Summary

Most consecutive cuts made – 6 (1968 U.S. Open – 1972 U.S. Open)
Longest streak of top-10s – 2 (1979 PGA – 1980 Masters)

U.S. national team appearances
PGA Cup: 1988 (winners)

See also 

 1967 PGA Tour Qualifying School graduates

References

External links

American male golfers
PGA Tour golfers
PGA Tour Champions golfers
Golfers from Tennessee
University of Tennessee at Chattanooga alumni
Sportspeople from Chattanooga, Tennessee
1941 births
Living people